Pammeces problema is a moth of the family Agonoxenidae. It was described by Walsingham in 1915. It is found in Colombia.

References

Moths described in 1915
Agonoxeninae
Moths of South America